Prokhladny (masculine), Prokhladnaya (feminine), or Prokhladnoye (neuter) is the name of several inhabited localities in Russia.

Urban localities
Prokhladny, Kabardino-Balkar Republic, a town in the Kabardino-Balkar Republic; 

Rural localities
Prokhladny, Labinsk, Krasnodar Krai, a settlement under the administrative jurisdiction of the Town of Labinsk in Krasnodar Krai; 
Prokhladny, Krymsky District, Krasnodar Krai, a khutor in Moldavansky Rural Okrug of Krymsky District in Krasnodar Krai; 
Prokhladny, Krasnoyarsk Krai, a settlement in Kanifolninsky Selsoviet of Nizhneingashsky District in Krasnoyarsk Krai
Prokhladny, Sverdlovsk Oblast, a settlement in Kosulinsky Selsoviet of Beloyarsky District in Sverdlovsk Oblast
Prokhladny, Voronezh Oblast, a khutor in Yudanovskoye Rural Settlement of Bobrovsky District in Voronezh Oblast
Prokhladnoye, Slavsky District, Kaliningrad Oblast, a settlement in Yasnovsky Rural Okrug of Slavsky District in Kaliningrad Oblast
Prokhladnoye, Zelenogradsky District, Kaliningrad Oblast, a settlement in Pereslavsky Rural Okrug of Zelenogradsky District in Kaliningrad Oblast
Prokhladnoye, Primorsky Krai, a selo in Nadezhdinsky District of Primorsky Krai
Prokhladnoye, Smolensk Oblast, a village in Gusinskoye Rural Settlement of Krasninsky District in Smolensk Oblast